Oleg Yaroslavich "Nastasich" (after 1161 – 1189) was a Rus' prince (a member of the Rurik dynasty). He was prince of Halych (1187, 1189).

Oleg was the illegitimate son of Prince Yaroslav Volodimerovich Osmomysl of Halych by his mistress, Nastaska, a daughter of a local boyar. The Galician boyars had his mother burned as a witch, forced his father to reinstate his wife (whom Yaroslav Volodimerovich had left in order to take Oleg’s mother), and imprisoned Oleg.

Yaroslav Volodimerovich died on 1 October 1187, giving Peremyshl (Przemyśl, Poland) to his only legitimate son, Vladimir Yaroslavich. At the same time, he designated Oleg as his successor in Halych, requesting that Vladimir and the Galicians promise not to take the city from Oleg. After his death, however, Oleg was deposed and had to seek help from Ryurik Rostislavich in Vruchiy. After Oleg failed to solicit aid from Ryurik Rostislavich, he went to Duke Casimir II of Poland (1177–1194).

Oleg's stepbrother, Vladimir Yaroslavych lived a dissolute life and took to himself a priest's wife. When the Galician boyars threatened to kill his wife, Vladimir Yaroslavich took her and his two sons and fled to King Béla III of Hungary (1172–1196). A later chronicle, however, describes the event differently, stating that Oleg and Duke Casimir II defeated Vladimir Yaroslavich and forced him to flee to the Hungarians, after which Casimir II appointed Oleg to Halych.

Oleg was poisoned by the townspeople of Halych who invited Roman Mstislavich of Vladimir-in-Volhynia to be their prince.

Ancestry

Footnotes

Sources
Dimnik, Martin: The Dynasty of Chernigov – 1146–1246; Cambridge University Press, 2003, Cambridge; .

1160s births
1189 deaths
Rurikids
Princes of Halych
Princes of Novgorod
12th-century princes in Kievan Rus'
Eastern Orthodox monarchs